The Serov Constituency (No.174) is a Russian legislative constituency in Sverdlovsk Oblast. The constituency covers northern Sverdlovsk Oblast.

Members elected

Election results

1993

|-
! colspan=2 style="background-color:#E9E9E9;text-align:left;vertical-align:top;" |Candidate
! style="background-color:#E9E9E9;text-align:left;vertical-align:top;" |Party
! style="background-color:#E9E9E9;text-align:right;" |Votes
! style="background-color:#E9E9E9;text-align:right;" |%
|-
|style="background-color:"|
|align=left|Andrey Selivanov
|align=left|Independent
|
|45.68%
|-
|style="background-color:"|
|align=left|Nikolay Trusov
|align=left|Independent
| -
|22.30%
|-
| colspan="5" style="background-color:#E9E9E9;"|
|- style="font-weight:bold"
| colspan="3" style="text-align:left;" | Total
| 
| 100%
|-
| colspan="5" style="background-color:#E9E9E9;"|
|- style="font-weight:bold"
| colspan="4" |Source:
|
|}

1995

|-
! colspan=2 style="background-color:#E9E9E9;text-align:left;vertical-align:top;" |Candidate
! style="background-color:#E9E9E9;text-align:left;vertical-align:top;" |Party
! style="background-color:#E9E9E9;text-align:right;" |Votes
! style="background-color:#E9E9E9;text-align:right;" |%
|-
|style="background-color:#1C1A0D"|
|align=left|Andrey Selivanov (incumbent)
|align=left|Forward, Russia!
|
|30.22%
|-
|style="background-color:"|
|align=left|Anatoly Sysoyev
|align=left|Independent
|
|23.28%
|-
|style="background-color:#00A200"|
|align=left|Pavel Fedulev
|align=left|Transformation of the Fatherland
|
|17.23%
|-
|style="background-color:"|
|align=left|Yevgeny Osipov
|align=left|Congress of Russian Communities
|
|9.03%
|-
|style="background-color:"|
|align=left|Gaptelbar Bareyev
|align=left|Liberal Democratic Party
|
|7.62%
|-
|style="background-color:#000000"|
|colspan=2 |against all
|
|10.74%
|-
| colspan="5" style="background-color:#E9E9E9;"|
|- style="font-weight:bold"
| colspan="3" style="text-align:left;" | Total
| 
| 100%
|-
| colspan="5" style="background-color:#E9E9E9;"|
|- style="font-weight:bold"
| colspan="4" |Source:
|
|}

1999

|-
! colspan=2 style="background-color:#E9E9E9;text-align:left;vertical-align:top;" |Candidate
! style="background-color:#E9E9E9;text-align:left;vertical-align:top;" |Party
! style="background-color:#E9E9E9;text-align:right;" |Votes
! style="background-color:#E9E9E9;text-align:right;" |%
|-
|style="background-color:#084284"|
|align=left|Valery Vorotnikov
|align=left|Spiritual Heritage
|
|28.67%
|-
|style="background-color:#1042A5"|
|align=left|Andrey Selivanov (incumbent)
|align=left|Union of Right Forces
|
|24.00%
|-
|style="background-color:#C21022"|
|align=left|Yevgeny Artyukh
|align=left|Party of Pensioners
|
|9.20%
|-
|style="background-color:"|
|align=left|Vitaly Biryukov
|align=left|Independent
|
|6.48%
|-
|style="background-color:#020266"|
|align=left|Aleksandr Ogluzdin
|align=left|Russian Socialist Party
|
|0.98%
|-
|style="background-color:#000000"|
|colspan=2 |against all
|
|24.51%
|-
| colspan="5" style="background-color:#E9E9E9;"|
|- style="font-weight:bold"
| colspan="3" style="text-align:left;" | Total
| 
| 100%
|-
| colspan="5" style="background-color:#E9E9E9;"|
|- style="font-weight:bold"
| colspan="4" |Source:
|
|}

2003

|-
! colspan=2 style="background-color:#E9E9E9;text-align:left;vertical-align:top;" |Candidate
! style="background-color:#E9E9E9;text-align:left;vertical-align:top;" |Party
! style="background-color:#E9E9E9;text-align:right;" |Votes
! style="background-color:#E9E9E9;text-align:right;" |%
|-
|style="background-color:#00A1FF"|
|align=left|Anton Bakov
|align=left|Party of Russia's Rebirth-Russian Party of Life
|
|35.79%
|-
|style="background-color:#1042A5"|
|align=left|Andrey Selivanov
|align=left|Union of Right Forces
|
|25.88%
|-
|style="background-color:#FFD700"|
|align=left|Valery Vorotnikov (incumbent)
|align=left|People’s Party
|
|9.91%
|-
|style="background-color:#C21022"|
|align=left|Yevgeny Artyukh
|align=left|Russian Pensioners' Party-Party of Social Justice
|
|6.58%
|-
|style="background-color:"|
|align=left|Ivan Kanisev
|align=left|Communist Party
|
|2.83%
|-
|style="background-color:"|
|align=left|Vsevolod Millerov
|align=left|Liberal Democratic Party
|
|1.99%
|-
|style="background-color:"|
|align=left|Valery Melekhin
|align=left|Independent
|
|1.12%
|-
|style="background-color:"|
|align=left|Artyom Glatskikh
|align=left|Independent
|
|0.83%
|-
|style="background-color:#000000"|
|colspan=2 |against all
|
|13.68%
|-
| colspan="5" style="background-color:#E9E9E9;"|
|- style="font-weight:bold"
| colspan="3" style="text-align:left;" | Total
| 
| 100%
|-
| colspan="5" style="background-color:#E9E9E9;"|
|- style="font-weight:bold"
| colspan="4" |Source:
|
|}

2016

|-
! colspan=2 style="background-color:#E9E9E9;text-align:left;vertical-align:top;" |Candidate
! style="background-color:#E9E9E9;text-align:leftt;vertical-align:top;" |Party
! style="background-color:#E9E9E9;text-align:right;" |Votes
! style="background-color:#E9E9E9;text-align:right;" |%
|-
| style="background-color: " |
|align=left|Sergey Bidonko
|align=left|United Russia
|
|43.64%
|-
| style="background-color: " |
|align=left|Sergey Semyonovykh
|align=left|A Just Russia
|
|17.50%
|-
|style="background-color:"|
|align=left|Aleksandr Stolbov
|align=left|Communist Party
|
|12.12%
|-
|style="background-color:"|
|align=left|Danil Shilkov
|align=left|Liberal Democratic Party
|
|10.57%
|-
|style="background-color:"|
|align=left|Galina Bastrygina
|align=left|People's Freedom Party
|
|3.21%
|-
|style="background-color:"|
|align=left|Aleksandr Ilyin
|align=left|Civic Platform
|
|2.55%
|-
|style="background-color:"|
|align=left|Lev Mordvov
|align=left|Party of Growth
|
|1.80%
|-
|style="background-color:"|
|align=left|Georgy Zharkoy
|align=left|Patriots of Russia
|
|1.60%
|-
|style="background-color:"|
|align=left|Maksim Shingarkin
|align=left|Rodina
|
|1.22%
|-
| colspan="5" style="background-color:#E9E9E9;"|
|- style="font-weight:bold"
| colspan="3" style="text-align:left;" | Total
| 
| 100%
|-
| colspan="5" style="background-color:#E9E9E9;"|
|- style="font-weight:bold"
| colspan="4" |Source:
|
|}

2019

|-
! colspan=2 style="background-color:#E9E9E9;text-align:left;vertical-align:top;" |Candidate
! style="background-color:#E9E9E9;text-align:left;vertical-align:top;" |Party
! style="background-color:#E9E9E9;text-align:right;" |Votes
! style="background-color:#E9E9E9;text-align:right;" |%
|-
|style="background-color: " |
|align=left|Anton Shipulin
|align=left|United Russia
|46,015
|41.59%
|-
|style="background-color: " |
|align=left|Aleksey Korovkin
|align=left|A Just Russia
|26,583
|24.03%
|-
|style="background-color: " |
|align=left|Gabbas Dautov
|align=left|Communist Party
|15,276
|13.81%
|-
|style="background-color: " |
|align=left|Yevgenia Chudnovets
|align=left|Liberal Democratic Party
|8,280
|7.48%
|-
|style="background-color: " |
|align=left|Irina Skachkova
|align=left|Yabloko
|3,999
|3.55%
|-
|style="background-color: " |
|align=left|Dmitry Zenov
|align=left|Communists of Russia
|3,700
|3.34%
|-
|style="background-color: " |
|align=left|Igor Ruzakov
|align=left|The Greens
|2,157
|1.95%
|-
| colspan="5" style="background-color:#E9E9E9;"|
|- style="font-weight:bold"
| colspan="3" style="text-align:left;" | Total
| 110,635
| 100%
|-
| colspan="5" style="background-color:#E9E9E9;"|
|- style="font-weight:bold"
| colspan="4" |Source:
|
|}

2021

|-
! colspan=2 style="background-color:#E9E9E9;text-align:left;vertical-align:top;" |Candidate
! style="background-color:#E9E9E9;text-align:left;vertical-align:top;" |Party
! style="background-color:#E9E9E9;text-align:right;" |Votes
! style="background-color:#E9E9E9;text-align:right;" |%
|-
|style="background-color: " |
|align=left|Anton Shipulin (incumbent)
|align=left|United Russia
|
|40.63%
|-
|style="background-color:"|
|align=left|Gabbas Dautov
|align=left|Communist Party
|
|20.28%
|-
|style="background-color:"|
|align=left|Aleksey Korovkin
|align=left|A Just Russia — For Truth
|
|12.24%
|-
|style="background-color:"|
|align=left|Pavel Myakishev
|align=left|Liberal Democratic Party
|
|6.59%
|-
|style="background-color:"|
|align=left|Yaroslav Borodin
|align=left|New People
|
|5.84%
|-
|style="background-color: "|
|align=left|Anatoly Rabinovich
|align=left|Party of Pensioners
|
|2.86%
|-
|style="background-color:"|
|align=left|Sergey Melnik
|align=left|Party of Growth
|
|2.76%
|-
|style="background-color: " |
|align=left|Dmitry Kalinin
|align=left|Yabloko
|
|1.94%
|-
|style="background-color:"|
|align=left|Valery Khvostov
|align=left|Rodina
|
|0.99%
|-
| colspan="5" style="background-color:#E9E9E9;"|
|- style="font-weight:bold"
| colspan="3" style="text-align:left;" | Total
| 
| 100%
|-
| colspan="5" style="background-color:#E9E9E9;"|
|- style="font-weight:bold"
| colspan="4" |Source:
|
|}

Notes

References

Russian legislative constituencies
Politics of Sverdlovsk Oblast